Dobrava pri Konjicah is a settlement northwest of Slovenske Konjice in eastern Slovenia. The area is part of the traditional region of Styria. The entire Municipality of Slovenske Konjice is now included in the Savinja Statistical Region of Slovenia.

Name
The name of the settlement was changed from Dobrava to Dobrava pri Konjicah in 1953.

References

External links
Dobrava pri Konjicah at Geopedia

Populated places in the Municipality of Slovenske Konjice